Team UK may refer to:

 Team Britain, a former professional wrestling stable
 United Kingdom national quidditch team

See also
 Team GB, the British Olympic Association